Dichromanthus cinnabarinus, commonly known as scarlet ladies' tresses, is a terrestrial species of orchid. It is common across much of Mexico, south to Guatemala, and north into Texas.

References

Spiranthinae
Orchids of North America
Flora of Mexico
Flora of Guatemala
Flora of Texas
Plants described in 1825